Bartenieff is a surname. Notable people with the surname include:

 George Bartenieff (1933–2022), German-American stage and film actor
 Irmgard Bartenieff (1900–1981), German-American dance theorist, dancer, choreographer, physical and dance therapist